Statistics of DPR Korea Football League in the 2001 season.

Overview
Amrokgang Sports Club won the championship.

DPR Korea Football League seasons
1
Korea
Korea